Barish   is a local authority in Southern Lebanon, located in Tyre District, Governorate of South Lebanon.

Name
E. H. Palmer wrote in 1881 that the name Barish meant "abounding in herbage".

Anis Freiha said that the origin of the name is Syriac: “The house of the chief and the lieutenant colonel, and he mentioned that there is another possibility that it is from the Hebrew bero ?sh: cypress, and in the Aramaic bero ?sh, and in the Syriac.”

Location
Barish is located in the South Governorate, Tyre District. It is 350 m above sea level and 89 kilometers to the southwest of Beirut, the capital city of Lebanon, or about an hour and a half, and 16 km from the center of its district Tyre. Its land area is 404 hectares. The number of its registered residents is 5000, expatriates 1500.

History
In 1875 Victor Guérin found that it had 300 Metawileh inhabitants. He further noted: "It is surrounded by plantations of fig trees, olive trees and tobacco; some houses and a small mosque were partly built with ancient materials, either found on site or from Broukhai". 

In 1881, the PEF's Survey of Western Palestine (SWP) described Barish as: "A village, built of stone, containing about 200 Christians, situated on the top of a hill, surrounded by gardens, figs, and arable land ; water supplied from cisterns in the village and spring near."

Education

References

Bibliography

External links
Survey of Western Palestine, Map 2:  IAA, Wikimedia commons

 Populated places in Tyre District
Shia Muslim communities in Lebanon